"Everyday We Lit" is a song by American rapper YFN Lucci featuring fellow American rapper PnB Rock. It was released on December 16, 2016, as the first single from Lucci's debut EP Long Live Nut (2017), and written alongside producer June James. The song peaked at number 33 on the Billboard Hot 100, becoming YFN Lucci's highest charting single on the chart and PnB Rock's second highest peak on the chart, behind his appearance on Ed Sheeran's "Cross Me", which peaked at number 25 on the Hot 100. The song was used in the 2017 season premiere of HBO’s Hard Knocks featuring the Tampa Bay Buccaneers.

Music video
The official lyric video for "Everyday We Lit" was uploaded to Lucci's Vevo channel on December 16, 2016. The music video, directed by Marc Diamond, premiered on the same channel on April 4, 2017. As of March 2023, the music video has 183 million views.

Remix
The official remix of the song. with additional features from Wiz Khalifa and Lil Yachty, was released on May 11, 2017.

Charts

Weekly charts

Year-end charts

Certifications

References

2016 singles
2016 songs
PnB Rock songs
Songs written by PnB Rock
Songs written by June James (record producer)
Empire Distribution singles